Hugh Lancelot of Lusignan or Hugues or Hughues Lancelot de Lusignan (died August 1442) was a Frankish Cardinal, often known as the Cardinal of Cyprus.

He was Latin Patriarch of Jerusalem 1424, and Archbishop of Nicosia. He was Regent during the captivity of his brother, King Janus.

He attended the Council of Basel, and became a supporter of antipope Felix V (Amadeus VIII, Duke of Savoy). As an envoy from the Council and, he presided in 1435 over the Congress of Arras, with Cardinal Niccolò Albergati, the papal legate.

He died at Geneva in August 1442.

Family

His father was James I of Cyprus. His niece, Anne of Lusignan, married Louis, Duke of Savoy, son of Amadeus VIII.

Notes

External links

1442 deaths
Greek Roman Catholics
Cardinal-bishops of Frascati
Cardinal-bishops of Palestrina
15th-century Roman Catholic archbishops in Cyprus
Latin Patriarchs of Jerusalem
Year of birth unknown
Hugues
Archbishops of Nicosia